Mary Mae Ward (maiden name Courtnee; previously Powers) is a fictional character from the ABC soap opera General Hospital from 1994–1995. Introduced as a grandmother character running an orphanage, it was revealed through backstory that she had formerly been the mistress of Edward Quartermaine, with whom she had the son Bradley Ward. She is also the grandmother of the late Justus Ward (M'fundo Morrison), Keesha Ward and the great-grandmother of Maya Ward.

Casting
The role of Mary Mae Ward was originated by Rosalind Cash (1938–1995) in 1994, who played her as a proud matriarch character who had triumphed over racism and tragedy.  When Cash died of cancer in 1995, the Mary Mae Ward character was written out of the series, with an explanation of having died of natural causes. In 1996, Cash was posthumously nominated for an Emmy Award, for Outstanding Supporting Actress in a Drama Series.

Brief Character History

Mary Mae Ward showed up in Port Charles after Laura Spencer bought the Ward House. Mary Mae and Laura became instant friends and ran an orphanage out of the Ward House. After her son Bradley Ward was found dead in Luke and Laura Spencer's yard, Mary Mae's grandson Justus and granddaughter Keesha came to Port Charles to attend Bradley's funeral. Bradley had been murdered, but who killed him? Keesha began dating the young, rich Jason Quartermaine. Mary Mae and Edward Quartermaine, both grandparents of the teens, weren't happy about the two dating each other. Soon all evidence of Bradley's death was pointing to Edward as the murderer. Edward was arrested and charged. He swore on his life to Mary Mae that he was not her son's killer. Mary Mae knew it and revealed during her testimony that Bradley was Edward's son. Edward had wartime romance with Mary Mae when she was a blue singer years ago which resulted in the conception of Bradley. Edward was later acquitted.

Mary Mae found herself singing the blues again when Lois Cerullo offered her a job at her record label, L&B. Mary Mae was a hit at Luke's club where everyone would go to listen to her beautiful voice.

Mary Mae was adored by many in Port Charles. When she died in her sleep in January 1996, the whole town turned out to pay their respects to their beloved Mary Mae.

References

External links
Mary Mae Ward profile Soapcentral.com

General Hospital characters
Fictional singers